The Jafar Sultan revolt refers to a Kurdish tribal revolt in Pahlavi Iran which erupted in 1931, and was one of the early tribal-nationalist Kurdish revolts against central Iranian rule during the early stage of Kurdish separatism in Iran.

Background
Jafar Sultan of Hewraman region took control of the area between Marivan and north of Halabja and remained independent until 1925.
Jafar Sultan is seen as the ”head” of the royal sultan family
(Lohoni, Lahoni)
From 1927-34 a number of Kurdish tribal uprisings erupted in the Hewraman and Meriwan regions. In 1926 Iranian forces fighting insurgents in the Pizhdar, Hewraman and Meriwan areas executed all prisoners in an unprecedented act of brutality, likely among the factors that caused 31 Kurdish chieftains in the region to ask for British protection.

See also

 Timeline of Kurdish uprisings
 List of modern conflicts in the Middle East

References

1930s in Iran
Conflicts in 1931
Kurdish rebellions in Iran